State Route 105 (SR 105) is a minor route in the southeastern part of the U.S. state of Alabama.  The route begins at a junction with SR 27 at Ozark and ends at SR 10 at Clopton, an unincorporated community in southeastern Barbour County.

Route description

SR 105 leads northeastward from its intersection with SR 27 in Ozark as it traverses through Dale County. The route travels primarily through rural areas, passing only through the unincorporated community of Skipperville before it crosses into Barbour County. SR 105 then passes through Clopton before coming to an end SR 10.

The route is a two-lane road for its duration.

Major intersections

References

105
Transportation in Dale County, Alabama
Transportation in Barbour County, Alabama